Carlos B. Schoeppl (1898–1990) was an American architect who practiced in Houston and Jacksonville, Florida, but he spent most of his career working in the Miami area. He received his training in Paris and London.

Early life
Carlos Schoeppl was born in Comfort, Texas in 1898. He was a first generation American. His father was Austrian; his mother was German. He studied architecture in Paris at the Beaux Arts Academy and in London at the Royal Academy, which influenced his preference for the Classical Revival style.

Career
In 1922, Schoeppl began private practice in Houston. He was the architect for the Fred J. Heyne House, which is listed on the National Register of Historic Places, and the Johnelle Bryan House (aka Bryan–Chapman House), which is recognized with a Texas Historical Marker. He moved to Jacksonville, Florida in 1926. In 1933, he relocated to Miami Beach, where he designed many homes for wealthy clients along the Gold Coast.

Works
A list of works by Schoeppl in chronological order:

References

20th-century American architects
1898 births
1990 deaths